Richie Feeney is a former Gaelic footballer who played for the Mayo county team.

A Right Half Back in the Mayo senior team, Feeney began playing with Castlebar Mitchels. He is the brother of fellow-player Alan Feeney,  He is a son of the late Ger Feeney, who won a minor All-Ireland in 1971 and an Under 21 title three years later. He is widely acknowledged as one of Mayo's finest ever half-backs.
Feeney played Forward in the 2012 and 2013 league.

In 2010, he was named Senior Footballer of the Year.

References

External links
 http://www.midwestradio.ie/mwr/sport/173-richie-feeney-named-senior-footballer-of-the-year-at-mayo-news-club-stars-banquet.html
 http://www.mayonews.ie/index.php?option=com_content&view=article&id=12819:youre-never-too-old-for-mayo&catid=14&Itemid=100008
 http://www.mayonews.ie/index.php?option=com_content&view=article&id=13239:feeneys-ready-for-final-test&catid=14&Itemid=100008
 http://www.independent.ie/sport/gaelic-football/friends-and-rivals-join-together-in-final-act-of-sorrow-2392401.html
 http://www.sportsmanager.ie/cake/gaa2/mayo/gallery

1983 births
Living people
Castlebar Mitchels Gaelic footballers
Mayo inter-county Gaelic footballers
People educated at St Gerald's College, Castlebar
People from Castlebar